Simon Artemievich Tereshchenko (25 May 1839 in Hlukhiv – 1893) was a millionaire, Hlukhiv city bank director, Glushkovsky cloth factory owner, and Kherson Oblast salt mine director.

Biography
Simon was born in Tereshchenko family to Artemy Tereshchenko and Euphrosyne Steslyavskaya, he was one of the Tereshchenko Brothers dynasty active family member. Simon was married to Olympia Viktorovna Velentei (Varengo, Tereshchenko). He studied in Hlukhiv district school. From October 26, 1866 he became Hlukhiv city bank director. And from September 26, 1870 he was declared as an official representator for Imperial Society special assignments. In 1871 was listed in the genealogical book of Kursk province.

Personal life
Simon Tereshchenko is known as the romantic creator of the famous and unique Tereshchenko rose, that he ordered to be developed and bred by the French rosarian known for his cultivation of rose cultivars Louis Lévêque in France, 1882, while the time the family lived in Paris. Louis Lévêque was very respectable florist among noble aristocratic and royal families. His creation Madame Olympia Tereshchenko rose is a divine white, carmine-pink shading rose with white blend Bourbon color, that holds its name for one the Tereshchenko Dynasty's women, Simon Tereshchenko's wife - Olympiada Tereshchenko

References

External links

1839 births
1893 deaths
Simon